Army Training Centre may refer to:

Sri Lanka Military Academy in Sri Lanka
Army Training Centres in the German Army of the Bundeswehr
Army Training Centre Pirbright in the United Kingdom